Julian Kayl Mandrake (born June 23, 1970 in San Diego, CA) is a guitarist best known for his work with the bands Canvas, Mothers Anthem, and Blue October

Music career

Julian played lead guitar in the band Canvas from 1999 until the band parted ways in 2006. That same year, Julian played guitar on Blue October's Foiled tour, covering Justin Furstenfeld's guitar parts while Justin was injured. His performances included Lollapalooza on August 4, 2006, as well as  Jimmy Kimmel Live! on June 28, 2006. Julian can be seen performing with Blue October during their 2006 VH1 sessions 

Following the breakup of Canvas, Julian played guitar in Joseph King's band which eventually became Deadbeat Darling, as well as setting out to build a new band of his own.  After several lineup and name changes, Julian's new band Mothers Anthem made their live debut on June 15, 2007.  The band recorded an album Save The Fallen which was released in 2009.

In late 2010, Julian was hired as Blue October's lead guitarist, playing on the Ugly Side: Acoustic Evening with Blue October tour in 2011, Any Man in America tour in 2011-2012 and the Quiet Mind tour in 2012.

References 

Alternative rock guitarists
American alternative rock musicians
Blue October members
Lead guitarists
Living people
Musicians from Austin, Texas
1970 births
Guitarists from Texas